= Pomona University =

Pomona University may refer to:

- California State Polytechnic University, Pomona (also known as Cal Poly Pomona), a public polytechnic university in Pomona, California, and part of the California State University
- Pomona College, a private liberal arts college in Claremont, California (founded in Pomona, California), and part of the Claremont Colleges consortium
